Larkham is a surname, which may refer to:

Brent Larkham, Australian tennis player
Brent Larkham, Australian musician
David Larkham, art director and designer
Mark Larkham, Australian racing driver 
Peter Larkham, British professor of planning
Stephen Larkham, Australian rugby union player
Tavis Larkham, American visual effects specialist/actor
Thomas Larkham, English Puritan clergyman
Todd Larkham, Australian tennis player
Trevor Larkham, English cricketer

References

English toponymic surnames